Braunschweig is a city in Lower Saxony, Germany.
Braunschweig may also refer to:

Braunschweig (district), a former German district
Braunschweig (electoral district), an electoral district in Germany
Braunschweig (region), a historic German administrative region
Braunschweig (state), a historic German state:
Braunschweig-Lüneburg, a historic German duchy (1235–1806)
Herzogtum Braunschweig, a historic German state (1815–1918)
Freistaat Braunschweig, a historic German state (1918–1946)
Braunschweig, Eastern Cape, a small town in the Eastern Cape province, South Africa
Braunschweig Airport, an airport in Germany
Braunschweig Hauptbahnhof, a railway station in Germany
Braunschweig University of Technology, a German university
Braunschweig meteorite, a meteorite that hit Braunschweig, Germany, in 2013
Braunschweig-class battleship, a class of early 20th-century battleships of the German Imperial Navy
Braunschweig-class corvette, a current class of ships of the German Navy
Eintracht Braunschweig, a German football club
Phantoms Braunschweig, a German basketball team
SMS Braunschweig, a German First World War battleship

See also

Brunswick
Braunschweiger (disambiguation)